Ghadir Saberi (also Romanized as Ghadīr Şāberī; also known as Ghadīr and Ghadīr-e Āberī) is a village in Bandar Charak Rural District, Shibkaveh District, Bandar Lengeh County, Hormozgan Province, Iran. At the 2006 census, its population was 128, in 27 families.

References 

Populated places in Bandar Lengeh County